The 2003 European Beach Volleyball Championships were held from August 29 to September 1, 2003 in Alanya, Turkey. It was the eleventh official edition of the men's event, which started in 1993, while the women competed for the tenth time. For the first time the event was incorporated in the new CEV European Beach Volleyball Tour, a combined Grand Prix of three tournaments. The first one was staged in Zagreb, Croatia (June 20 to June 22), the second one in Rethymnon, Greece (July 9 to July 13).

Men's competition
 A total number of 35 participating couples

Women's competition
 A total number of 36 participating couples

References
 Beach Volleyball Results

2003
E
Beach Volleyball
B
Sport in Antalya
21st century in Antalya
August 2003 sports events in Turkey
September 2003 sports events in Turkey